Kurt Schweiger (born 12 February 1934) is a former Austrian cyclist. He competed in the individual road race and team time trial events at the 1960 Summer Olympics.

References

External links
 

1934 births
Living people
Austrian male cyclists
Olympic cyclists of Austria
Cyclists at the 1960 Summer Olympics
People from Mattersburg District
Sportspeople from Burgenland